Height of the Wave is a 2019 South Korean drama film directed by Park Jung-bum. It was first aired as part of tvN's 2019 Drama Stage television series. Unlike the television drama, the newly edited film features the guilt and greed between the characters. It premiered at the 20th Jeonju International Film Festival on 3 May 2019. It made its international premiere and won the Special Jury Prize in the International Competition section of the 72nd Locarno Film Festival in August 2019.

Plot
Police Officer Yeon-soo (Lee Seung-yeon) is dispatched to an island with her daughter after her divorce. When she witnesses the strange relationship between orphan Ye-eun and the island workers in the closed island village community, it terrifies her.

Cast
 Lee Seung-yeon as Yeon-soo
 Lee Yeon as Ye-eun
 Choi Eun-seo
 Park Yeong-deok
 Shin Yeon-sik
 Park Jung-bum
 Ryu Hae-joon as Seong-dae

Awards and nominations

References

External links
 
 

2019 films
2010s Korean-language films
Films directed by Park Jung-bum
South Korean drama films
2010s South Korean films